Myroides xuanwuensis is a Gram-negative, aerobic, rod-shaped and non-motile bacterium from the genus of Myroides which has been isolated from forest soil from Jiangsu.

References

Flavobacteria
Bacteria described in 2014